Class B may refer to:

 Class B (baseball), a defunct class in minor league baseball in North America
 Class B (classification), a Paralympic wheelchair fencing classification
 Class B drug, in British law
 Class B share, a “class” of common or preferred stock
 Class B star
 Barry Railway Class B, a British steam locomotive
 LNWR Class B, a British steam locomotive
 Class B office space, a step below Class A office space
 An Army Service Uniform
 An airspace class defined by the ICAO
 A power amplifier class
 A class of broadcast station in North America
 An electronic device conforming to FCC rule Title 47 CFR Part 15, Subpart B, Class B
 An explosives category for professional fireworks; see Fireworks policy in the United States
 A network in the Internet classful network system
 A pathogen treatment and pollutant criterion, an EPA reuse category in biosolids
 A recreational vehicle, or campervan
 A class of boat in the European Union

See also
 B-class (disambiguation)
 Type B (disambiguation)